The André Cavens Award is an accolade presented annually by the Belgian Film Critics Association (UCC), an organization of film critics from publications based in Brussels. The André Cavens Award was introduced in 1976 by the organizing committee to honor cinematic achievement in Belgium. The name of the award comes from film director André Cavens.

The most awarded filmmakers are Jean-Pierre and Luc Dardenne with five awards, followed by Jaco Van Dormael, Joachim Lafosse, and Fien Troch with three. Other multiple winners are Jean-Jacques Andrien, André Delvaux, and Lukas Dhont with two awards each. As of 2022, Close is the most recent winner.

Winners

1970s

1980s

1990s

2000s

2010s

2020s

References

External links
André Cavens Awards at RTBF

Belgian film awards
Awards established in 1976
Awards for best film
Lists of films by award